Mr. Dude is Portland, Oregon's mascot in Japan.

Description
The bearded, blue character was introduced in a video hosted on the website Odnarotoop.com, which was created by Travel Portland in 2016 as part of a campaign called the "World of Odnarotoop". The campaign's name comes from the Japanese pronunciation of Portland, spelled backwards. The video's theme song is performed by the Portland-based rock band Ages and Ages in Japanese, with some English words and phrases such as "breakfast", "crazy donuts", and "ice cream". Mr. Dude is featured on the website, saying, "Are you the one who want to go to Odnarotoop? I am your guide/camera man. Nice to meet you. Let's take a picture to start the trip." He also instructs users to upload their pictures, which are integrated into the music video.

The mascot was inspired by "the joy and lightheartedness that the city embodies" and Sasquatch (or Bigfoot). Some Reddit users speculated that Mr. Dude was derived from a Portland man who is often seen wearing blue makeup, though a Travel Portland representative has denied that the mascot was based on any particular individual. He clarified, "[Mr. Dude] is a characterization of the city, but any resemblance to a real person is purely coincidence. The character is not based on 'a man who walks around Portland in blue makeup' and that person is not associated with Travel Portland."

A live version of Mr. Dude has appeared before the Japanese Association of Travel Agents and at a tourism conference in Tokyo.

Impact
In September 2016, Travel Portland credited Mr. Dude and the "World of Odnarotoop" campaign with helping to increase Japanese visitation to Portland by as much as eleven percent in the preceding eighteen months.

References

Culture of Portland, Oregon
Tourism in Japan
Tourism in Oregon
Mascots introduced in 2016
Male characters in advertising